Riddick Bowe vs. Larry Donald was a professional boxing match contested on December 3, 1994.

Background
Just over a year prior, Riddick Bowe had defended his WBA and IBF titles in a highly anticipated rematch with Evander Holyfield, the man he had defeated to capture the titles. In a closely contested match, Holyfield would win by majority decision, becoming the new  heavyweight champion and handing Bowe his first (and would what turn out to be his only) loss as a professional. After nine months of inactivity, Bowe made his return on August 13, 1994, to face fringe contender Buster Mathis, Jr. in his first comeback fight. Bowe was clearly ahead on the scorecards when Mathis took a knee to recover after being overwhelmed by a barrage of heavy punches from Bowe. However, while Bowe quickly landed a right hand that knocked Mathis out. As the punch was illegal and Mathis could not continue, Bowe faced the possibility of being charged with a disqualification loss, but both referee Arthur Mercante Sr. and the New Jersey State Athletic Control Board decided to rule the bout a no-contest. Having narrowly escaped a second consecutive loss, Bowe agreed to face undefeated prospect Larry Donald in his next fight. Donald was only in his second year as a pro, but had won all 16 of his fights, including victories over fellow undefeated prospect Jeremy Williams and former heavyweight title challenger Bert Cooper. Donald was also ranked by all three major boxing organizations, with the WBC ranking him highest of all at number 5. In contrast, Bowe was only ranked by two of the three organizations (#5 by the IBF and #8 by the WBA) and despite being only two years removed from capturing their heavyweight championship, was completely unranked by the WBC.

At a press conference in Los Angeles only five days before the fight was to take place, Bowe and Donald exchanged words when Bowe suddenly hit Donald with a left-right combination before the two were separated. Donald did not retaliate, but was critical of Bowe for the act, calling him "unprofessional", "afraid" and stated "When you try so hard to intimidate someone, it means that you're the one who's intimidated." Bowe offered no apology to Donald and simply explained that he "had heard that he was talking trash, and I told him, 'if you say one more thing, I'm going to hit you'. He opened his mouth again, so I popped him."

The Fight
In what would prove to be a largely uneventful fight, Bowe would earn an overwhelmingly lopsided decision. Bowe was the aggressor for the entire fight while Donald used a defensive strategy and spent most of the fight retreating from Bowe while throwing punches in short flurries before quickly moving away. Bowe dominated the punch stats, landing 219 punches during the course of the fight while Donald landed only 103. The official scorecards were also clearly in Bowe's favor. One judge had Bowe winning all 12 rounds and scored the fight 120–108 in his favor. The other two judge's had Bowe winning 10 of the 12 rounds and scored the fight 118–109 and 118–110.

Aftermath
Despite possessing an impressive 35–1 record, Bowe  still found difficulty in securing a match for one of the major heavyweight titles. As a result, Bowe would challenge Herbie Hide  for the WBO title, which at the time was less regarded than the WBA, WBC and IBF versions of the title. Bowe would ultimately defeat Hide in dominating fashion on March 11, 1995, to capture the WBO championship. He would then have two more fights in 1995, first obtaining a knockout victory over former amateur rival Jorge Luis González in what would prove to be his only defense of the WBO title, and then knocking out Evander Holyfield in their anticipated rubbermatch. All in all, Bowe finished 1995 a perfect 3–0 with three knockout victories that increased his record to 38–1.

Donald would finish the remainder of the decade without recording another loss, though most of his fights were against journeymen and past-their-prime former contenders. Nevertheless, with his record now standing at an impressive 38–1–2, Donald secured a WBA title "eliminator" bout with Kirk Johnson in 2001 with the victor earning a shot at John Ruiz and the WBA heavyweight title, though he would lose by a close decision. Donald would earn several more WBA title "eliminator" fights but was unable to win any of them. He would retire in 2007 with a record of 42–5–3.

References

1994 in boxing
Donald
1994 in sports in Nevada
December 1994 sports events in the United States
Caesars Palace